Timothy Gooch may refer to:

Tim Gooch, umpire, see Indianapolis Colts draft history
Sir Timothy Robert Sherlock Gooch, 13th Baronet (1934–2008) of the Gooch baronets